Afrobeata is a genus of jumping spiders that was first described by Lodovico di Caporiacco in 1941.  it contains only three species, found only in Tanzania, Ethiopia, and on Socotra: A. firma, A. latithorax, and A. magnifica. The name is derived from "Africa" and the genus Beata.

References

Salticidae
Salticidae genera
Spiders of Africa